Lake Teedyuskung is a 79-acre reservoir located in Lackawaxen Township, Pennsylvania. The nine-acre Little Teedyuskung Lake is also located in Pike County. 

In the early 20th century, Lake Teedyuskung was the site of the Dan Beard Outdoor School, a private school. It is home to Woodloch Pines, a family resort.

See also
List of lakes in Pennsylvania

References 

Bodies of water of Pike County, Pennsylvania
Teedyuskung